Leroy Charles Buchiet (June 12, 1892 – March 7, 1952) was an American football and basketball coach.  He served as the head football coach for the Hillsdale College in Hillsdale, Michigan for four seasons, from 1914 until 1917, compiling a record of 9–13–3. Buchiet was also the head basketball coach at Hillsdale from 1914 to 1918, tallying a mark of 18–28 He played football and basketball and ran track at Lake Forest College.

Head coaching record

Football

References

1892 births
1952 deaths
American men's basketball players
Hillsdale Chargers football coaches
Hillsdale Chargers men's basketball coaches
Lake Forest Foresters football players
Lake Forest Foresters men's basketball players
College men's track and field athletes in the United States
Illinois College alumni
People from Beardstown, Illinois
Coaches of American football from Illinois
Players of American football from Illinois
Basketball coaches from Illinois
Basketball players from Illinois